Trapezus or Trapezous, also known as Trapezuntus or Trapezountos (Τραπεζοῦντος), was a town of ancient Arcadia, in the district Parrhasia, a little to the left of the river Alpheius. It is said to have derived its name from its founder Trapezeus, the son of Lycaon, or from trapeza (τράπεζα, 'a table') because Zeus here overturned the table on which Lycaon offered him human food. It was the royal residence of Hippothous, who transferred the seat of government from Tegea to Trapezus. On the foundation of Megalopolis, in 371 BC, the inhabitants of Trapezus refused to remove to the new city; and having thus incurred the anger of the other Arcadians, they quitted Peloponnesus, and took refuge in Trapezus on the Pontus Euxeinus (modern Trabzon), where they were received as a kindred people. The statues of some of their gods were removed to Megalopolis, where they were seen by Pausanias.

Its site is located near modern Mavria, in the municipal unit of Gortyna.

See also
List of Ancient Greek cities

References

External links
 Ancient Trapezounta on GTP Travel Pages

Populated places in ancient Arcadia
Former populated places in Greece
Parrhasia